Pool B of the 2015 Fed Cup Americas Group I was one of two pools in the Americas Group I of the 2015 Fed Cup. Three teams competed in a round robin competition, with the top team and the bottom two teams proceeding to their respective sections of the play-offs: the top team played for advancement to the World Group II Play-offs, while the bottom team faced potential relegation to Group II.

Standings

Paraguay vs. Bolivia

Venezuela vs. Mexico

Paraguay vs. Mexico

Venezuela vs. Bolivia

Paraguay vs. Venezuela

Mexico vs. Bolivia

References

External links 
 Fed Cup website

2015 Fed Cup Americas Zone